Domecy-sur-le-Vault (literally Domecy on the Vault) is a commune in the Yonne department in Bourgogne-Franche-Comté in north-central France.

The commune is known for the Château de Domecy-sur-le-Vault.

See also
Communes of the Yonne department

References

External links 

Communes of Yonne